Michael Spivey (commonly known as Mike Spivey) is a British computer scientist at the University of Oxford.

Spivey was born in 1960 and educated at Archbishop Holgate's Grammar School in York, England. He studied mathematics at Christ's College, Cambridge and then undertook a DPhil in computer science on the Z notation at Wolfson College, Oxford and the Programming Research Group, part of the Oxford University Computing Laboratory.

Mike Spivey is a University Lecturer in Computation at the Oxford University Department of Computer Science and Misys and Anderson Fellow of Computer Science at Oriel College, Oxford.  His main areas of research interest are compilers and programming languages, especially logic programming. He wrote an Oberon-2 compiler.

Publications 
Understanding Z: A Specification Language and its Formal Semantics, Cambridge University Press, Cambridge Tracts in Theoretical Computer Science, No. 3, 2008. .
The Z Notation: A reference manual, Prentice Hall International Series in Computer Science, 1992. .
An introduction to logic programming through Prolog, Prentice Hall International Series in Computer Science, 1996. .

References

External links 
 Official home page
 Personal home page
 

1960 births
Living people
People educated at Archbishop Holgate's School
Alumni of Christ's College, Cambridge
Alumni of Wolfson College, Oxford
Fellows of Oriel College, Oxford
English computer scientists
Formal methods people
Logic programming researchers
Computer science writers
Members of the Department of Computer Science, University of Oxford
Programming language researchers
Z notation